The Venda Defence Force (VDF) was established in September 1982 from the 112 Battalion of the South African Defence Force and the military branch of the Venda National Force which itself had been formed when the Venda homeland became independent from South Africa in September 1979.

Venda Defence Force

Origin
The Venda National Force was established with Venda’s independence in 1979 and included defence and other services such as police and prisons. Strange enough, traffic policing was part of this national force, but by 1981 it was transferred to the Department of Justice. The Fire Brigade was however still part of the Venda National Force although there was plans to transfer this to the civilian government.

Development of the VDF
Colonel Gabriel Ramushwana was appointed the Chairman of the Council and Minister of Defence and National Intelligence was second in command as well as the Venda Security Police before being transferred to the VDF as Chief of Staff by State President Patrick Mphephu with the aim of his eventual succession as Chief of the VDF.

112 Battalion and One Venda Battalion
The VDF itself was formally separated from the National Force on the 27 September 1982 when the SADF’s 112 Battalion from Madimbo, part of the Soutpansberg Military Area, which was outside the Venda territory, was disbanded and re-established to form One Venda Battalion at Manenu. At that stage this battalion consisted of three companies and was to all purposes a light infantry battalion.

Two Venda Battalion
Two Venda Battalion was established around 1985/86 and was initially housed in temporary quarters until 1986/1987.

Air Wing

The VDF also consisted of a small air wing consisting of light helicopters (MBB/Kawasaki BK 117 and Aérospatiale Alouette III) and fixed wings (CASA C-212 Aviocar and Cessna Citation II).

Coup
A bloodless coup occurred on 5 April 1990, the then Colonel Ramushwana was attending a SADF Army Staff Course in Pretoria. Until that date the Chief of the VDF was a seconded SADF officer, Brigadier Steenkamp, with Ramushwana as his Chief of Staff. 
State President Ravele was the Commander in Chief and was advised by a Security Council.

Aftermath
After the coup, Ramushwana became Chief of the VDF as well as the Chairman of the Council of National Unity.  
A Security Working Committee was established to replace the Security Council. The SEWOCOM consisted of:
Ramushwana, now a Brigadier, as chairman, 
the Chief of Staff of the VDF, a Colonel W. Swanepoel, 
the Senior Staff Officer intelligence, Lt. Col. Muthambi
the Senior Staff Officer Operations, Lt. Col. Vermeulen
the Police Commissioner, Colonel Phaswana
the Director General of the Venda National Intelligence, 
the Advocate-General, Moosa Batlivala and 
two other members of the Council of National Unity.

This committee dealt with all security related issues in Venda including the quality of government, since the coup followed widespread allegations of corruption and maladmistration.

Insignia

Ranks
Officer ranks

Other ranks

Disbandment
With the end of the Apartheid era in 1994 in South Africa, the former defence forces of the Bantustans were incorporated into the newly formed South African National Defence Force.

Equipment
The VDF was equipped for counter-insurgency (COIN) operations. The VDF used:
R4/R5 assault rifles,
5.56 mm Light Machine Gun,
7.62 mm Medium Machine Gun
40 mm Multiple Grenade Launcher, 
60 mm and 
81 mm mortars
12.7 mm Browning Heavy Machine Gun

Vehicles included: 
Mambas, 
Buffels, 
Samil 20,
seven ton Isuzu trucks and 
4x4 vehicles

References

Apartheid government
Organisations associated with apartheid
Defunct organisations based in South Africa
Disbanded armed forces
Military units and formations established in 1979
Military units and formations of the Cold War
Military units and formations of South Africa
Venda
Military decorations and medals of Venda
Military units and formations disestablished in 1994